On April 15, 2021, a mass shooting occurred at a FedEx Ground facility in Indianapolis, Indiana, United States. Nine people were killed, including the gunman, 19-year-old former employee Brandon Scott Hole, who committed suicide. Seven others were injured, including four by gunfire. It is the deadliest mass shooting in the history of Indiana.

Background
The FedEx facility where the shooting occurred is located in the southwestern part of the city, near Indianapolis International Airport. The building is equipped with metal detectors and security turnstiles at its entrance requiring the employees to scan their FedEx badges. There were at least 100 people in the facility at the time of the shooting, and many of them were changing shifts or on lunch breaks.

Events
Hole drove to the facility, arriving during a shift change. He first went into the building and spoke with security, then he returned to his vehicle. According to Indianapolis police, Hole began firing at employees in the parking lot with a rifle shortly after exiting his vehicle again. He then proceeded to the facility's entrance, where he resumed shooting. The shooting lasted less than four minutes. A witness reported hearing him yelling but could not understand what he was saying. According to other witnesses, people inside the facility were unable to contact help due to the company's no-phone policy.

Officers with the Indianapolis Metropolitan Police Department responded to the scene shortly after 11:00p.m. local time. Hole had killed himself inside the facility before they arrived. An audio recording of the police dispatch for the scene of the shooting indicated that Hole was found with two rifles.

Victims
There were nine fatalities in the shooting, including Hole. Their ages ranged from 19 to 74 years old. Four victims were found dead outside the facility, and another four were found dead inside. Four of the victims were Sikhs. According to the local police chief, about 90% of workers at the facility were members of the local Sikh community. Four other people were taken to the hospital, including one who was in critical condition; all of them suffered gunshot wounds. A fifth person sought treatment in another county, while two others were treated at the scene and released.

The following were killed in the shooting:
Karli Smith, 19
Samaria Blackwell, 19
Matthew Alexander, 32
John Weisert, 74
Amarjit Sekhon, 48
Jasvinder Kaur, 50
Jaswinder Singh, 68
Amarjeet Johal, 66

Perpetrator
Police identified the gunman as Brandon Scott Hole (August 20, 2001 — April 15, 2021), a 19-year-old Indianapolis resident who had been employed at the FedEx facility from August to October 2020; he was fired for failing to return to work. After the shooting, authorities conducted a search of his home and seized evidence, including electronics. An investigation of archived content from Hole's deleted Facebook accounts did not reveal any potential motives but the investigation revealed that he was a "brony", a fan of the animated series My Little Pony: Friendship Is Magic. Less than an hour before the shooting, Hole posted to his Facebook account: "I hope that I can be with Applejack in the afterlife, my life has no meaning without her. If there's no afterlife and she isn't real then my life never mattered anyway." After an investigation, the Federal Bureau of Investigation (FBI) eventually concluded that the mass shooting was "an act of suicidal murder" intended to "demonstrate his masculinity and capability while fulfilling a final desire to experience killing people."

Hole had been diagnosed with several behavioral disorders starting in the fourth grade and had undergone behavioral therapy sessions for them. His behavior in childhood deteriorated to a point where police had to be called to the home on at least two occasions, and where he could not attend school and graduate. As a teenager, he became suicidal and physically abusive towards his mother. In March 2020, Hole's mother contacted the local authorities and warned them about her son's intent to die by suicide by cop and his purchase of a shotgun the day before, prompting an investigation to be opened. Police responded to the home and took him to a hospital. While being placed in handcuffs, an anxious Hole instructed the officers to turn off his computer, since he did not want anyone to see what was on it. An officer went upstairs to seize the shotgun and observed what he identified as white supremacist websites on Hole's computer in the process. Hole was placed in an "immediate detention mental health temporary hold" by the Indianapolis Metropolitan Police Department, but he was released after less than two hours. In April 2020, the FBI questioned Hole about the websites. The investigation was later closed due to insufficient evidence of any criminal violation or a racially motivated extremist ideology held by Hole, though the shotgun was not returned to him.

According to the police, Hole used two AR-15 style rifles in the shooting, and both of them were legally purchased from a licensed gun store in July and September 2020. Under Indiana's red flag law, Hole could have been prevented from making firearm purchases for at least six months after his temporary mental health detainment if a hearing had been scheduled with a judge fourteen days after the seizure of his shotgun. However, Marion County prosecutors decided to not schedule such a hearing, believing authorities had already achieved the law's objective since Hole's family did not want the seized shotgun back. Prosecutor Ryan Mears also said that if his office had proceeded with the hearing and lost, given Hole had been treated by medical professionals but not prescribed any medication, they would have been forced to return the shotgun to him. The police did not reveal where Hole had bought the rifles used in the shooting, instead saying the investigation was still ongoing.

Aftermath and reactions
On April 16, President Joe Biden ordered flags to be flown at half-staff. He and Vice President Kamala Harris released statements expressing their condolences with the victims' families. Later, during a press conference with Japanese Prime Minister Yoshihide Suga, Biden decried the recent string of mass shootings in the United States as a "national embarrassment" and called on Congress to ban military-style assault weapons and large-capacity ammunition magazines. On April 18, Hole's family apologized to the victims' families for his actions. On April 20, Governor Eric Holcomb announced his intention to restore full funding for mental health services and bolster it over the next two years. Democratic state politicians made calls to review and strengthen the red flag law, but this was put on hold after the 2021 legislative session ended on April 22.

Indian Foreign Minister S. Jaishankar said the incident was deeply shocking and offered all possible assistance, as some of the victims were of Indian origin. Since four of the victims were members of the Sikh community and Hole had browsed white supremacist websites in the past, the Sikh Coalition, a Sikh-American advocacy group, called on authorities to investigate whether bias played a role in the shooting.

Following the shooting, attention was directed at Indiana's red flag law for its requirements to prohibit someone from owning a firearm, which were not carried out when authorities seized a shotgun from Hole; this allowed him to purchase the guns he used in the shooting. The Indiana Fraternal Order of Police criticized Marion County Prosecutor Ryan Mears for sidestepping the process and "[failing] to do his part", while Mears criticized the red flag law for having too many "loopholes". FedEx's no-phone policy, which seemed to prevent people from contacting employees at the facility during the shooting, was also scrutinized.

See also
 List of mass shootings in the United States in 2021
 Greenwood Park Mall shooting

References

2021 in Indiana
2021 mass shootings in the United States
2021 murders in the United States
FedEx shooting
21st-century mass murder in the United States
Attacks on buildings and structures in 2021
Attacks on buildings and structures in the United States
Deaths by firearm in Indiana
April 2021 crimes in the United States
April 2021 events in the United States
FedEx
Mass murder in 2021
Mass murder in the United States
Mass shootings in Indiana
Mass shootings in the United States
Mass murder in Indiana
FedEx shooting
Workplace shootings in the United States
2021 active shooter incidents in the United States